Ptychohyla zophodes is a species of frogs in the family Hylidae. It is endemic to Mexico and known from the Atlantic slopes of the Sierra Madre de Oaxaca in northern Oaxaca and adjacent central-western Veracruz. Before being described as a new species in 2000, it was mixed with Ptychohyla leonhardschultzei. The specific name zophodes is a Greek word meaning "dusky" or "gloomy" and refers to the distinctive dark coloration of the species as well as its cloud forest habitat. Common name gloomy mountain stream frog has been coined for it.

Description
Adult males in the type series measure  and adult females  in snout–vent length. The snout is rounded in dorsal view and truncate in profile. The supratympanic fold is well developed and covers the upper edge of the tympanum. The forelimbs are moderately robust; the fingers are moderately long, have large discs, and are about one-third webbed. The hind limbs are moderately long and slender. The toe discs are only slightly smaller than those on the fingers; the toes are about three-fourths webbed. The dorsal ground color is deep brown, grading into purplish brown on the sides. There is irregular black mottling and two irregular black transverse bars on the shanks; these markings are not conspicuous in all specimens. Females are slightly paler than males.

The male advertisement call is a deep "wraack".

Habitat and conservation
It typically occurs in vegetation close to streams. The tadpoles develop in streams. Adults are mostly seen at night. The species is threatened by habitat loss from small-scale farming and wood extraction and by chytridiomycosis.

References

zophodes
Frogs of North America
Endemic amphibians of Mexico
Fauna of the Sierra Madre de Oaxaca
Taxa named by Jonathan A. Campbell
Taxa named by William Edward Duellman
Amphibians described in 2000
Taxonomy articles created by Polbot